Debbie Does Dallas ... Again is a 2007 Vivid Entertainment sequel to Debbie Does Dallas featuring Monique Alexander, Savanna Samson, Hillary Scott, Stefani Morgan and Sunny Leone.

Director Paul Thomas said rather than remaking the original, "I spun the story closest to Heaven Can Wait, where Debbie dies and is reincarnated in the body of another cheerleader."

On July 12, 2007, the movie became the first adult title licensed by the Advanced Access Content System (AACS) to be sold in the Blu-ray Disc format. It was also the first adult movie available in both HD DVD and Blu-ray formats. Other companies had released a very few adult films on Blu-ray by this point, but they were not copy-protected or licensed, and were burned in-house, some on BD-R discs.

Debbie Does Dallas Again was also the original name of a weekly, 30-minute behind the scenes documentary to the remaking of Debbie Does Dallas – from the casting search for the next Debbie, to planning and shooting of the movie. Renamed Debbie Loves Dallas in reruns, it was produced by World of Wonder.

Cast
 Monique Alexander
 Savanna Samson
 Hillary Scott
 Stefani Morgan
 Sunny Leone
 Evan Stone

Awards and nominations

References

External links
 
 
 

Showtime (TV network) original programming
2000s English-language films
2000s pornographic films
AVN Award winners
Films set in Dallas
2000s American films